Batman: The Animated Series is a side-scrolling action game by Konami released for the Game Boy in 1993 based on the TV series of the same title. A Super NES version was also planned, but the game was ultimately released under the title The Adventures of Batman & Robin due to the show undergoing a title change between seasons.

Gameplay
The game is an action-adventure platformer. The player can switch between Batman or Robin to gain access to character-specific abilities. Batman uses a grappling hook to scale heights, Robin walks across ceilings, and both characters can perform wall jumps.

See also
List of Batman video games

References

External links
 

1993 video games
Video games based on Batman: The Animated Series
Video games based on adaptations
Game Boy games
Game Boy-only games
Konami games
Superhero video games
Video games set in the United States
Video games developed in Japan